Ramon Vargas Colman (3 March 1925 – 14 July 1983) was a Paraguayan composer and musician.

Youth

Colman was born in the village of Tebicuarymí, a town close to Caballero, Paraguarí Department, Paraguay.  At the time of his birth, Tebicuarymí belonged to the Guairá Department. His father died when he was very young and since then he had to perform various activities to make sustainable life for his family, whose head was his mother. He died in Asuncion, capital of Paraguay on 14 July 1983.

His musical style marched toward folk music popular in his country, from young and famous duos of the era, such as: Melgar-Chase and the Brothers Caceres.  He served as a model to affirm their desire to become singers and songwriters.

In 1952, he formed a duo that lead to success and significance that their teachers knew, the duo Vargas-Saldivar, composed by him and also interpreter and composer Andrés Cuenca Saldivar.

Style
A simple style that obviously is reflected in the numerous compositions created along his career, that style fully shows his conditions.

Compositions like, "Mokoi Kogoe", "13 Tuyuti" and "Tupasy del Campo" are testimonies of his great artistic sensibility that served to bring music to the lyrics of great poets.

First Steps

Andres Cuenca Saldivar, their duet, recalls the following in a letter contained in the files of Authors Paraguayans Partners (APA): 
"When I came to Buenos Aires with the harpist Pedro Gamarra, I met Ramon Vargas Colman, with him, then, an official at the port of Asunción, in 1958, we recorded the first album, our first success was the song Vapor Cue, and our work recording took place at all times and on a regular basis. The last time was recorded in the year 1980 " said the artist.

Career

Indeed, the ultimate success and dedication nationally and internationally, would arrive with the characteristic composition and known as interpreted by the duo Vargas-Saldivar "Vapor Cue", which lyrics describe the deeds of the Paraguayan naval fleet during the Paraguayan War (also known as the War of the Triple Alliance).

This theme was recorded in 1958 for the label "Columbia" Argentina, with the special participation in the interpretation of Harp, another enshrined in this instrument the artist Lorenzo Leguizamón.

In the 70's, the Duo-Vargas Saldivar was presented at numerous venues of Latin American countries in international tours, performing; had the opportunity to bring their art to many cities in Argentina, Bolivia, Brazil, Uruguay and other countries of the South America. In 1972, they sang for “El Mundo de Buenos Aires” a very important radio program.

In 1979, Paraguayan residents  in the United States organized a Historical and multitudinous presentation according to a letter preserved in APA.

Works

Among his many compositions, stand some that have become true icons of native Guarani songbook; songs as:
 13 Tuyuti (written by Emiliano R. Fernandez).
 Tupasy del Campo.
 Mokoi Kogoe.
 Ko´ape che avy´ave.
 Serenata Carmencitape.
 Che resa mbohory jára.
 Porque siempre rohayhu.
 Cadete Alberto Benítez.
 Mariposa del Ensueño.
 Amada Flor.
 Romilda (to his wife).
 Mi Ofrenda.
 Ambición.
 Che Sy Hipolita Pe Guará.
 Muñequita.

Bibliography
 Sonidos de mi Tierra.

1925 births
1983 deaths
People from Paraguarí Department
Paraguayan composers
Male composers
20th-century composers
20th-century male musicians